The Kadu Malleshwara Temple  is a 17th-century A.D. Hindu temple dedicated to the Shiva located in the Malleshwara locality of Bengaluru, Karnataka, India. The word 'Kadu' means forest, here referring to the thick greenery all around the temple.

About
The temple was built in the 17th century A.D. by Venkoji, the brother of the Maratha King Shivaji in Dravidian style of architecture. Shiva is worshipped as Mallikarjun.  One part of the temple, Nandishwara Teertha Temple (Basava Theertha), is in front of the temple. It is said to be the main source or birthplace of the Vrishabhavathi River.

Architecture 
Kadu Malleshwara Temple is developed in the Dravidian engineering style amid the reign of King Venkojirao Bhonsle of Thanjavur.

Festivals 
The main annual festival is Shivaratri. Thousands of devotees from Bengaluru and around visit this temple on the holy day of Shivratri festival.

Connectivity 
The temple is located in Malleswaram locality of Bengaluru. Bengaluru is well connected by air, road and railways. It can be reached via air at Bangalore International Airport which is located at a distance of 40 km from the city. Bengaluru receives various trains from all over the India and is well connected by roadways.

References

Hindu temples in Bangalore
Shiva temples in Karnataka